Nicolás Ariel Messiniti (born 21 February 1996) is an Argentine professional footballer who plays as a forward for Tristán Suárez, on loan from Independiente.

Career
Messiniti's career began with Argentine Primera División side Independiente. In July 2017, Messiniti was loaned out to fellow Primera División team San Martín. His professional debut arrived on 28 October in a 1–0 home win against Estudiantes. A loan to Defensores de Belgrano of Primera B Nacional was confirmed on 22 August 2018.

Career statistics
.

References

External links

1996 births
Living people
Sportspeople from Avellaneda
Argentine footballers
Argentine expatriate footballers
Association football forwards
Argentine Primera División players
Primera Nacional players
Categoría Primera A players
Club Atlético Independiente footballers
San Martín de San Juan footballers
Defensores de Belgrano footballers
Club Atlético Temperley footballers
Once Caldas footballers
CSyD Tristán Suárez footballers
Argentine expatriate sportspeople in Colombia
Expatriate footballers in Colombia